Alfredo Jesús Berti (born 5 October 1971) is an Argentine football manager and former player who played as a midfielder.

Career
Berti managed Newell's Old Boys from 24 July 2013 to 11 April 2014, replacing Gerardo Martino. He was also the successor of Gabriel Heinze at Argentinos Juniors in 2017.

References

External links

1971 births
Living people
People from Constitución Department
Argentine footballers
Association football midfielders
Argentine football managers
Newell's Old Boys footballers
Atlas F.C. footballers
América de Cali footballers
Boca Juniors footballers
Argentine Primera División players
Categoría Primera A players
Newell's Old Boys managers
Aldosivi managers
Independiente Rivadavia managers
Argentinos Juniors managers
Club Atlético Belgrano managers
Barracas Central managers
Argentine expatriate footballers
Argentine expatriate football managers
Expatriate footballers in Mexico
Expatriate footballers in Colombia
Expatriate football managers in Paraguay
Sportspeople from Santa Fe Province
Central Córdoba de Santiago del Estero managers
Sportivo Luqueño managers